Gabby is a given name, usually a short form of Gabriel or Gabrielle or Gabriella. 

Gabby or Gabbie may refer to:

People with the name
 Gabby Chaves (born 1993), Colombian-American racing driver
 Guy Gabaldon (also "Gabby"; 1926–2006), United States Marine
 Gabby Gabreski (1919–2002), Polish-American career pilot in the United States Air Force
 Gabby Giffords (born 1970), American politician and gun control advocate
 Gabby Levy, Israeli diplomat
 Eugenio Lopez III (also "Gabby"; born 1952), Filipino-American businessman
Gabrielle- no jus no
 Mark López (Filipino executive) (also "Gabby"; born 1972), chairman of ABS-CBN Corporation
 Gabby Nsiah Nketiah (born 1943), Ghanaian businessman and politician
 Gabby O'Connor (born 1974), Australian installation artist
 Gabby Petito (1999–2021), American crime victim
 Gabby Price (born 1949), American-football coach
 Gabby Revilla (born 1982), film producer
 Gabby Rivera, American writer and storyteller
 Gabby Westbrook-Patrick (born 1996), New Zealand-born Australian model

Actors
 Gabby Concepcion (born 1964), Filipino actor and businessman
 Gabby Eigenmann (born 1978), Filipino actor, singer, host and model
 George "Gabby" Hayes (1885–1969), American actor
 Gabby Millgate, Australian actress, writer and comedian
 Gabourey Sidibe (also "Gabby"; born 1983), American actress and author
 Gabby West (born 1985), American actress

Athletes
 Gabby Adcock (born 1990), English badminton player
 Gabrielle Andrews (also "Gabby"; born 1996), American professional tennis player
 Gabby DeLoof (born 1996), American swimmer
 Gabby Espinas (born 1982), Filipino professional basketball player
 Gabriel Lees (also "Gabby"; born 1990), French-born British ski mountaineer
 Gabby Mayo (born 1989), American sprinter
 Gabby O'Sullivan (born 1994), Australian rules footballer and basketball player
 Gabrielle Reece (also "Gabby"; born 1970), American professional volleyball player, sports announcer, fashion model and actress
 Gabrielle Sinclair (also "Gabby"; born 1993), Australian netball player
 Gabby Sullivan (born 1998), New Zealand cricketer
 Gabby Sutcliffe (born 2002), Australian cricketer
 Gabby Thomas (born 1996), American sprinter
 Gabby Traxler (born 1998), Canadian professional racing cyclist
 Gabby Williams (born 1996), American-French professional basketball player

Baseball players
 Gabby Hartnett (1900–1972), American professional baseball player and manager
 Gabby Kemp (1919–1993), American Negro league second baseman and manager
 Gabby Street (1882–1951), American catcher, manager, coach, and radio broadcaster in Major League Baseball

Footballers
 Gabriel Agbonlahor (also "Gabby"; born 1986), English former professional footballer
 Gabby Collingwood (born 1999), Australian rules footballer
 Gabrielle George (also "Gabby"; born 1997), English women's footballer
 Gabby McGill (born 2000), English footballer
 Gabby Newton (born 2001), Australian rules footballer
 Gabby Seiler (born 1994), American professional soccer player
 Gabby Seymour (born 1996), Australian rules footballer
 Gabriela Villagrand (also "Gabby"; born 1999), American-born Panamanian footballer

Gymnasts
 Gabby Douglas (born 1995), American artistic gymnast
 Gabrielle Jupp (also "Gabby"; born 1997), British artistic gymnast
 Gabby Logan (born 1973), British presenter and a former international rhythmic gymnast
 Gabby May (born 1993), Canadian artistic gymnast
 Gabby Perea (born 2002), American artistic gymnast

Musicians
 Gabby Abularach, American musician
 Gabby Alipe, vocalist and guitarist with the Filipino rock band Urbandub
 Gabby Barrett (born 2000), American country music singer and songwriter
 Gabby La La (born 1979), vocalist and multi-instrumentalist
 Mighty Gabby (born 1948), Barbadian calypsonian and folk singer
 Gabby Glaser, musician with the alternative rock/rap-rock group Luscious Jackson
 Gabby Pahinui (1921–1980), slack-key guitarist and singer of Hawaiian music

Fictional characters
 Gabby, fictional character from the animated television series My Little Pony: Friendship is Magic
 Gabby, fictional character from the American computer-animated series Pet Alien
 Gabby Gabby, fictional character from Disney/Pixar's Toy Story franchise
 Gabby Gator, an animated cartoon character who appeared in several cartoons produced by Walter Lantz
 Gabby Goat, an animated cartoon character in the Warner Bros. Looney Tunes series of cartoons
 Gabby, a character from Blaze and the Monster Machines
 Gabby Johnson, fictional character from the American satirical Western black comedy film Blazing Saddles
 Gabby Johnson, fictional character from the British soap opera Family Affairs
 Gabby Kinney, fictional character from the 2015 Marvel Comics series All-New Wolverine
 Gabby Sharpe, fictional character from the British Channel 4 soap opera, Hollyoaks
 Gabby Thomas, fictional character from the British ITV soap opera, Emmerdale
 Uncle Gabby, protagonist of the Sock Monkey series of comics and illustrated books
 Gabby Girl, the main protagonist of Gabby's Dollhouse.

See also 

 Gaby (disambiguation)

Unisex given names
English unisex given names
Lists of people by nickname
Hypocorisms